Lacon is a city in, and the county seat of, Marshall County, Illinois, United States. It is part of the Peoria Metropolitan Statistical Area. The population was 1,878 at the 2020 census, down from 1,937 in 2010.

History
Lacon was named after Laconia, a region of Greece. Lacon was established in 1831. It was the site of the lynching of F. W. Stewart in 1898.

Geography

It is situated on the east shoreline of the Illinois River.

Illinois Route 17 passes through the city center as Ferry Street, leading west across the Illinois River on the Lacon Bridge into Sparland. Route 17 leads east  to Wenona and west  to Wyoming. Illinois Route 26 also runs through the center of Lacon, following Prairie Street. It leads northeast up the Illinois River valley  to Hennepin and south along the river  to East Peoria.

Demographics

As of the census of 2000, there were 1,979 people, 797 households, and 540 families residing in the city. The racial makeup of the city was 80.09% White, 7.10% African American, 0.10% Native American, 0.20% Asian, 0.10% from other races, and 0.40% from two or more races. Hispanic or Latino of any race were 12.91% of the population.

There were 797 households, out of which 28.1% had children under the age of 18 living with them, 55.6% were married couples living together, 7.9% had a female householder with no husband present, and 32.2% were non-families. 28.6% of all households were made up of individuals, and 15.4% had someone living alone who was 65 years of age or older. The average household size was 2.35 and the average family size was 2.87.

In the city, the population was spread out, with 21.7% under the age of 18, 7.0% from 18 to 24, 25.4% from 25 to 44, 21.9% from 45 to 64, and 24.1% who were 65 years of age or older. The median age was 42 years. For every 100 females, there were 88.8 males. For every 100 females age 18 and over, there were 83.6 males.

The median income for a household in the city was $40,203, and the median income for a family was $47,670. Males had a median income of $36,250 versus $20,694 for females. The per capita income for the city was $18,309. About 3.6% of families and 5.0% of the population were below the poverty line, including 6.2% of those under age 18 and 5.2% of those age 65 or over.

Notable people 

 Charles N. Barnes, Illinois politician and lawyer
 Robert Boal, Illinois politician
 Lucy Page Gaston, anti-tobacco crusader
 Valerie Allen Marland, First Lady of West Virginia (1953-1957)
 Robert V. McGarvey, U.S. National Champion racehorse trainer
 Nellie Bangs Skelton, composer and pianist
 Robert Sproull, educator and physicist

References

External links

Cities in Illinois
Cities in Marshall County, Illinois
County seats in Illinois
Peoria metropolitan area, Illinois
1831 establishments in Illinois